Denise Maillet Main is a leading AIDS activist and a preeminent doctor in the San Francisco Bay area. Main is the President of Siempre Unidos California, and is Director of the Prenatal Diagnosis Center at California Pacific Medical Center.

Biography 

Born on February 8, 1950, to Andre and Vera Maillet in New York City, Main grew up in Venezuela and Puerto Rico, returning to the United States only for college.

Main received her B.A. degree from Yale College in 1972. She then graduated from Medical School at the University of Vermont College of Medicine in 1977.  She did her internship at St. Louis Children's Hospital in 1978 and had residencies there and Barnes-Jewish Hospital from 1979 through 1982. Main received a fellowship from the University of Pennsylvania in 1984.

Main is board certified in Obstetrics and gynaecology, maternal fetal medicine, medical genetics, and pediatrics.

Career

AIDS work 

Main is the president of Siempre Unidos California.

In 2007, the Yale College of Divinity recognized her important work with an honorary doctor of humane letters.

Maternal fetal medicine 

Main has served on the board of the Society of Maternal Fetal Medicine and was a founding fellow of the American College of Medical Genetics. In 1990, she established California Pacific's Prenatal Diagnosis Center, which has grown into one of the most respected Prenatal Diagnosis centers in the United States. Main regularly appears on lists of the best doctors in maternal-fetal medicine.

References

1950 births
Living people
HIV/AIDS activists
Yale College alumni
University of Vermont alumni